The Tongwane River is a river in Limpopo Province, South Africa. It flows southward and is a tributary of the Olifants River, joining it southeast of Polokwane.

The Tongwane River was possibly named after Mohlatlole warriors who fought battles around Mafefe in Limpopo in the 1500s.

See also
 List of rivers of South Africa

References

External links
The Olifants River Basin, South Africa
The Olifants River System
The Olifants River

Olifants River (Limpopo)
Rivers of Limpopo